

Arthropods

Newly named insects

Archosauromorphs

Newly named pseudosuchians

Newly named dinosaurs
Data courtesy of George Olshevsky's dinosaur genera list.

Anapsids

Turtles

Synapsids

Non-mammalian

Paleontologists
 Death of Eberhard Fraas.

References

1910s in paleontology
Paleontology
Paleontology 5